The third Zoramthanga ministry is the third Cabinet assembled by Zoramthanga the then Chief Minister of Mizoram. His party, the Mizo National Front (MNF) secured an absolute majority in the 2018 elections.

Zoramthanga was elected leader of the party in the assembly and was sworn in as Chief Minister of Mizoram on December 15, 2018. He earlier served as Chief Minister for two terms from December 1998 to December 2008. The MNF captured 26 of the 40 seats in the state assembly.

Council of Ministers

References

Zoramthanga
Mizo National Front
Lists of current Indian state and territorial ministries
2018 in Indian politics
2018 establishments in Mizoram
Cabinets established in 2018